Xuanhan County is a county in the northeast of Sichuan Province, China, bordering Chongqing to the east. It is under the administration of the prefecture-level city of Dazhou.

According to recent population census, Xuanhan county has a population of about 1.3 million people.

The town of Xuanhan is located in the valley of a river called Zhouhe. The town is surrounded by mountains. Because of its location in the loop of the river the town of Xuanhan is quite oblong. Besides from the very populated centre of the Xuanhan county, Xuanhan contains many mountains and much natural landscapes.

History
Xuanhan County was called Dongxiang County from the 8th year of the Emperor He of Han (Yongyuan era, A.D. 96) until 1913. In 1914, after the establishment of the Republic of China, the county changed its name to Xuanhan County.

Transport
It will be served by Xuanhan South railway station and Fankuai railway station on Chongqing–Xi'an high-speed railway in the future.

Climate

References

 
County-level divisions of Sichuan
Dazhou